Kendell McFayden (born September 16, 1988) is an American soccer player and coach who plays as a forward.

Career

College and amateur
During his college years McFayden also played with the Austin Aztex U23 in the USL Premier Development League, scoring 8 goals in 16 games for the team.

Professional
McFayden turned professional in 2010 when he signed with the Austin Aztex in the USSF Division 2 Professional League. He made his professional debut, and scored his first professional goal, on July 31, 2010, in a 3–1 victory over Miami FC.

He was released by the Aztex at the end of the 2010 season, prior to their relocation to Florida and their rebranding as Orlando City. Having been unable to secure a professional contract elsewhere, McFayden signed to play with the Kitsap Pumas in the USL Premier Development League in 2011.

In March 2012 McFayden had a try out with USL Pro team Rochester Rhinos. He scored a goal in a preseason friendly against Colgate University.

McFayden returned to hometown club FC Buffalo in 2014, achieving the remarkable feat of becoming both the club’s all-time leading goal scorer and the first FCB center back to be named to the NPSL Best XI. McFayden was the captain of FC Buffalo for the 2015 and 2016 seasons.

Coaching 
McFayden works besides as soccer coach, from 2013 to 2015 as Assistant coach of the women soccer team of Medaille Mavericks and from 2015 to 2016 as Assistant coach of the Men soccer team of Fredonia State Blue Devils.

References

External links
 Austin Aztex bio
 Medaille bio

1988 births
Living people
American soccer players
Cascade Surge players
Austin Aztex U23 players
Austin Aztex FC players
Kitsap Pumas players
Rochester New York FC players
USL League Two players
National Premier Soccer League players
USSF Division 2 Professional League players
USL Championship players
People from Williamsville, New York
American soccer coaches
Association football forwards
FC Buffalo players
Fredonia Blue Devils men's soccer coaches
Soccer players from New York (state)
Sportspeople from Erie County, New York
Medaille Mavericks men's soccer players
Medaille Mavericks women's soccer coaches